Österforse is a locality situated in Sollefteå Municipality, Västernorrland County, Sweden with 204 inhabitants in 2010.

Climate
Österforse has a borderline continental/subarctic climate that is quite moderate in nature considering its inland position and latitude. Summer days are very warm for North Central Sweden, being heavily affected by its low elevation in comparison to areas further west such as Östersund. Temperatures are heavily dependent on wind direction and the convergences of warm southerly and cold northerly air.

References 

Populated places in Sollefteå Municipality
Ångermanland